The 2022–23 Bosnia and Herzegovina Football Cup is the 27th edition of Bosnia and Herzegovina's annual football cup, and the twenty second season of the unified competition.

Velež Mostar are the defending champions, having defeated Sarajevo to secure their first title in the previous year's final.

Calendar

Bracket

First round
Played on 18 and 19 October 2022.

Second round
Played on 18 and 19 February 2023.

Quarter-finals
Played on 28 February and 1 March, and on 14, 15 and 16 March 2023.

References

External links
Football Association of Bosnia and Herzegovina
SportSport.ba

2022-23
2022–23 in Bosnia and Herzegovina football
2022–23 European domestic association football cups